Muhammad Naeem Anwar is a Pakistani politician who was a Member of the Provincial Assembly of the Punjab, from May 2013 to May 2018.

Early life and education
He was born on 6 May 1957 in Bahawalnagar.

He received matriculation level education.

Political career

He was elected to the Provincial Assembly of the Punjab as a candidate of Pakistan Muslim League (Z) from Constituency PP-284 (Bahawalnagar-VIII in 2013 Pakistani general election.

References

Living people
Punjab MPAs 2013–2018
1957 births
Pakistan Muslim League (Z) politicians